The following highways are numbered 27A:

United States
Maryland Route 27A
 Nebraska Spur 27A
 New York State Route 27A
 County Route 27A
 County Route 27A (St. Lawrence County, New York)
 County Route 27A (Westchester County, New York)

Territories
 Guam Highway 27A